The  were a class of submarine chasers of the Imperial Japanese Navy (IJN), serving during and after World War II; there were three sub classes, however the IJN's official document calls all of them the No.13 class.

Background
In 1938 the Soviet Union strengthened its Pacific Ocean Fleet, increasing the number of submarines it possessed; the No.13 class was designed to counter this potential threat to Japanese shipping.

Ships in classes

No.13 class
Project number K8. 15 vessels were built in 1939-42 under the Maru 4 Programme (Ship # 180 – 183) and the Maru Rin Programme (Ship # 184 – 194). And after the Maru Rin Programme vessels were equipped with a kitchen and food storage between bridge and the chimney for a long cruise.

No.28 class
Project number K8B. 31 vessels were built in 1941-44 under the Maru Rin Programme (Ship # 221 – 232) and the Maru Kyū Programme (Ship # 440 – 458). They abolished a slant of stern for mass production.

No.60 class
Project number K8C. 3 vessels were built in 1943-44 under the Kai-Maru 5 Programme (Ship # 5341, # 5342 and 5344). They were changed inner hull design from the No.28 class. Therefore, there is not a difference of appearances.

Photo

Bibliography
Monthly Ships of the World, Special issue Vol. 45, "Escort Vessels of the Imperial Japanese Navy", (Japan), February 1996
Model Art Extra, No. 340 "Drawings of Imperial Japanese Naval Vessels Part-1",  (Japan), October 1989
The Maru Special, Japanese Naval Vessels No. 49, "Japanese submarine chasers and patrol boats",  (Japan), March 1981
50-year History of Harima Zōsen, Harima Zōsen Corporation, November 1960

World War II naval ships of Japan
Submarine chaser classes
 
Ships built by Hitachi Zosen Corporation